Carlton is an unincorporated community in Prowers County, in the U.S. state of Colorado. It sits at an elevation of, 3,537 feet.

References

Unincorporated communities in Prowers County, Colorado
Unincorporated communities in Colorado